The 1970 Western Kentucky football team represented Western Kentucky University during the 1970 NCAA College Division football season. The team was led by coach Jimmy Feix and won the Ohio Valley Conference championship after coming in second the previous three years. The coaching staff included future NFL coach Romeo Crennel. The Hilltoppers’ finished the season ranked No. 12 in the AP and No. 9 in the UPI final polls.

The team roster included future National Football League (NFL) players Lawrence Brame, Bill "Jelly" Green, Clarence "Jazz" Jackson, Brad Watson, and Mike McCoy.  Brame was named to the AP All-American team as well as being the OVC Defensive Player Of The Year for the second consecutive year.  The All-OVC team included Jim Barber, Brame, Jay Davis, Dennis Durso, Green, and Steve Wilson.

Schedule

References

Western Kentucky
Western Kentucky Hilltoppers football seasons
Ohio Valley Conference football champion seasons
Western Kentucky Hilltoppers football